Hilarographa belizastrum is a species of moth of the family Tortricidae. It is found in the Cordillera Occidental of Colombia.

The wingspan is about 21 mm. The ground colour of the forewings is orange in the terminal part, but suffused anteriorly. The remaining area is brown with a slight orange admixture and indistinct fine creamish marks. The hindwings are brown.

Etymology
The specific name refers to the similarity with Hilarographa belizeae and is derived from Latin astrum (a suffix expressing a similarity).

References

Moths described in 2011
Hilarographini